Syama is a rural locality (a village) in Novlenskoye Rural Settlement, Vologodsky District, Vologda Oblast, Russia. The population was 2 as of 2002.

Geography 
Syama is located 69 km northwest of Vologda (the district's administrative centre) by road. Anfalovo is the nearest rural locality.

References 

Rural localities in Vologodsky District

 Siamzha in sanskrit union of people